The 1928 United States presidential election in Oregon took place on November 6, 1928, as part of the 1928 United States presidential election. Voters chose five representatives, or electors, to the Electoral College, who voted for president and vice president.

Background
Outside a few Presidential and gubernatorial elections like that of 1922 influenced by the Ku Klux Klan, Oregon was a virtually one-party Republican state during the “System of 1896”, where the only competition was via Republican primaries. Apart from Woodrow Wilson’s two elections, during the first of which the GOP was severely divided, no Democrat since William Jennings Bryan in 1900 had carried a single county in the state.

In 1924 Oregon had nonetheless been the fifth-strongest of the fifteen Western and Plains States for Democrat John W. Davis behind Ozark mountaineer-dominated Nebraska, Mormon Utah and southern-leaning New Mexico and Arizona. Moreover, although maverick Wisconsin Senator Robert M. La Follette Sr. fared less well than in the other Pacific States, he still gained nearly one in four of Oregon's ballots as an independent. However, when La Follette died in 1925 his family endorsed New York City Catholic Democrat Al Smith, towards whose faith Oregon's largely Puritan (in the northwest) or Ozark Methodist (in the south and east), Anglo-Saxon and fiercely anti-Catholic populace was strongly hostile. This had been seen in a notorious law outlawing private religious schools under Klan-supported Governor Walter M. Pierce, whose decision was viewed unconstitutional by both the Oregon Supreme Court in 1924 and federally in Pierce v. Society of Sisters a year later.

Despite this severe wariness, Smith did manage to win the state's Democratic presidential primary against token opposition from Missouri Senator James Reed and Montana Senator Thomas Walsh, whilst Secretary of Commerce Herbert Hoover won the state's Republican primary unopposed with over six times as many voters. From the beginning polls showed opposition to Smith's Catholicism and anti-Prohibition views as very strong in Oregon, and neither major party would campaign in the state during the fall. October polls showed Hoover winning the state by a two-to-one margin and Smith gaining no more than a quarter of the La Follette vote. As of 2020, this is the final presidential election in Oregon in which a Republican carries all of the state’s counties.

Vote
Whereas in more Catholic states of the northern “Frost Belt” like Wisconsin, North Dakota and Minnesota Smith was able to revive a moribund Democratic Party at a Presidential level, Oregon's smaller but still significant La Follette electorate concentrated in the lower Willamette Valley and arch-isolationist Southern Oregon balked at voting for a Catholic. Consequently, Republican nominee Hoover was able to gain 13.17 percent upon Calvin Coolidge’s 1924 performance in the Beaver State and become the fifth Republican in seven presidential elections to sweep all Oregon’s counties.

This would be the last occasion until Donald Trump in 2016 that Columbia County voted for a Republican Presidential candidate.

Results

Results by county

See also
 United States presidential elections in Oregon

References

Oregon
1928
1928 Oregon elections